Máiréad "Peig" Sayers (29 March 18738 December 1958) was an Irish author and seanchaí ( or  – plural) born in Dún Chaoin, County Kerry, Ireland. Seán Ó Súilleabháin, the former Chief archivist for the Irish Folklore Commission, described her as "one of the greatest woman storytellers of recent times".

Biography
She was born Máiréad Sayers in the townland of Vicarstown, Dunquin, County Kerry, the youngest child of the family. She was called Peig after her mother, Margaret "Peig" Brosnan, from Castleisland. Her father Tomás Sayers was a renowned storyteller who passed on many of his tales to Peig. At the age of 12, she was taken out of school and went to work as a servant for the Curran family in the nearby town of Dingle, where she said she was well treated. She spent two years there before returning home due to illness.

She spent the next few years as a domestic servant working for members of the growing middle class produced by the Land War. She had expected to join her best friend Cáit Boland in America, but Cáit wrote that she had had an accident and could not forward the cost of the fare. Peig moved to the Great Blasket Island after marrying Pádraig Ó Guithín, a fisherman and native of the island, on 13 February 1892.

She and Pádraig had eleven children, of whom six survived.

The Norwegian scholar Carl Marstrander, who visited the island in 1907, urged Robin Flower of the British Museum to visit the Blaskets. Flower was keenly appreciative of Peig Sayers' stories. He recorded them and brought them to the attention of the academic world.

After the Easter Rising of 1916, Peig hung up a framed picture of the 16 executed Irish Volunteers and Irish Citizen Army leaders in the family's cottage in Great Blasket Island. During a search of the Island by the Black and Tans during the subsequent Irish War of Independence, a terrified Pádraig Ó Guithín ordered his wife to take the picture down before she got them all killed. Even though Peig indignantly refused, the search party did not harm anyone in their family.

In the 1930s a Dublin teacher, Máire Ní Chinnéide, who was a regular visitor to the Blaskets, urged Peig to tell her life story to her son Mícheál. Peig was illiterate in the Irish language, having received her early schooling only through the medium of English. She dictated her biography to Mícheál. He then sent the manuscript pages to Máire Ní Chinnéide in Dublin, who edited them for publication. The book was published in 1936.

Over several years from 1938 Peig dictated 350 ancient legends, ghost stories, folk stories, and religious stories to Seosamh Ó Dálaigh of the Irish Folklore Commission (while another source tallies 432 items collected by Ó Dálaigh from her, some 5,000 pages of material). Peig had a vast repertoire of tales, ranging from the Fenian Cycle of Irish mythology to romantic and supernatural stories.

One matter of speculation is whether there was delicate material that a female informant such as she would have refrained from recounting to a male collector (Irish Folklore Commission's policy being to hire only male collectors), though there was evidently close rapport established between the two individuals, which perhaps overrode such hypothetical barriers. She was also among the informants not comfortable with being recorded mechanically on the Ediphone, so the material had to be taken down on pen and paper.

She continued to live on the island until 1942, when she returned to her native place, Dunquin. She was moved to a hospital in Dingle, County Kerry where she died in 1958. She is buried in the Dún Chaoin Burial Ground, Corca Dhuibhne, Ireland. All her surviving children except Mícheál emigrated to the United States to live with their descendants in Springfield, Massachusetts.

Books

The books were not written down by Peig, but were dictated to others.

Peig

Peig is among the most famous expressions of a late Gaelic Revival genre of personal histories by and about inhabitants of the Blasket Islands and other remote Irish locations. Tomás Ó Criomhthain's memoir  ("the Islandman", 1929) and Muiris Ó Súilleabháin's , and Robert J. Flaherty's documentary film Man of Aran address similar subjects. The movement swiftly found itself the object of some derision and mockery – especially among the more cosmopolitan intellectual bourgeois of Ireland – for its often relentless depictions of rural hardship.

Peig depicts a traditional Irish-speaking way of life still surviving despite rackrenting Anglo-Irish landlords, the resulting extreme poverty, devout Catholicism, and mass emigration to the New World following a ceremonial "American wake". Peig also grew up upon a rich oral tradition of Irish folklore, mythology, and local history, including local folk heroes like Piaras Feiritéar, faction fights at pattern days and market fairs before the Great Famine, and the lingering memory of Mass rocks and priest hunters under the Penal Laws. 

The often bleak tone of the book is established from its opening words:

The book was widely used as a text for teaching and examining Irish in many secondary schools. As a book with arguably sombre and depressing themes (its latter half cataloguing a string of heartbreaking family tragedies), its presence on the Irish syllabus was often harshly criticised.

It led, for example, to the following comment from Seanadóir John Minihan in the Seanad Éireann in 2006 when discussing improvements to the curriculum:

According to Blasket Islands scholar Cole Moreton, however, this was not Peig's fault, but that of her censors, "Some of her stories were very funny, some savage, some wise, some earthy; but very few made it into the pages of her autobiography. The words were dictated to her son, then edited by the wife of a Dublin school inspector, and both collaborators sanitized the text a little in turn so that it was homely and pious, a book fit to be taken up as a set text in Irish schools. The image of Peig's broad face smiling out from beneath a headscarf, hands clasped in her lap, became familiar to generations of schoolchildren who were bored rigid by this holy peasant woman who had been forced upon them. They grew up loathing Peig... without hearing the stories as they were intended."

Peig was eventually replaced by Maidhc Dainín Ó Sé's A Thig Ná Tit Orm during the mid-1990s.

Popular culture
In Paddywhackery, a television show from 2007 on the Irish language on television channel TG4, Fionnula Flanagan plays the ghost of Peig Sayers, sent to Dublin to restore faith in the language.

A stage play, Peig: The Musical! (co-written by Julian Gough, Gary MacSweeney and the Flying Pig Comedy Troupe) was also loosely based on Peig's autobiography.

See also 
Tomás Ó Criomhthain

References
Citation

Bibliography

 

1873 births
1958 deaths
Irish-language writers
Irish memoirists
People from Dingle
Women storytellers